The Boy Spies of Philadelphia is a children's novel originally published in 1897 under the title With Washington at Monmouth.  It is one of a series of "Boy Spies" novels dating to the 1890s and early 1900s written by James Otis Kaler (writing as James Otis) and William P. Chipman.

The Boy Spies of Philadelphia tells the story of a group of boy spies who helped the Continental Army at Valley Forge.

Plot

The Boy Spies of Philadelphia begins with three friends, the oldest being sixteen years old and the youngest hardly a year younger; the eldest, Jacob Ludwick, the second oldest, Seth Graydon, and the youngest was Enoch Ball. The two oldest joined the Continental Army in 1777, while Enoch was not really enrolled because his mother would not let him join, yet he helped Jacob and Seth on some of their missions, and took part as spies to help Washington at Valley Forge. The boys’ first mission was to gather information in the very heart of the British camp. The boy spies had very little craft in the amount of secrecy need to be a spy; therefore, they were never really better than some amateurs.

Enoch was later on summoned to join the army, his task was to be done by himself and to find and deliver the message that George Washington moved from Valley Forge to General Dickinson who was attempting to harass the enemy during his march. At camp, the boys set off on another mission all together. They are to lounge by the side of the road and learn which direction General Clinton proposes to march from the town near Mount Holly, a town in New Jersey; the boys were to return to the camp within forty-eight hours, even if the scout was unsuccessful in gathering any information. On the way to the town, the boy spies rest at a mysterious man's house; they get trapped inside as prisoners of a Tory, enemies to the Whig party. When they escaped they headed back to camp because they had injuries and couldn't proceed. The three-boy-spy-group continued to help the Continentalists and took part in the Battle of Monmouth as spies for General Washington.

Missions

First Dangerous Mission

During their first spy mission, Jacob, Seth, and Enoch, were assigned to gather information on the British. They had gathered enough intel and mounted on horses, ready to leave camp. The boys were discussing what they were going to tell General Lafayette when they got back to base. However, a group of British soldiers, stationed on the side of the road, overheard them talking and tried to trap the boys with a forest fire but failed. Jacob and Enoch were very nearly killed as the bullets whistled over their heads and about half a dozen men began to chase them on horseback. The boys were being chased by the soldiers for over thirty minutes until finally their horses gave in and the soldiers lost sight of the boy spies.

Mount Holly Hospitality

To be able to enlist in the army, Enoch had to find and give General Dickinson a letter that stated that George Washington's troops had moved out of Valley Forge. Following General Arnold's directions to find Dickinson, Enoch reached him during the night. While resting at Dickinson's campsite, Enoch was reunited with Seth and Jacob. The boys traveled ten miles from the campsite without any weapons, uniforms, or any markings that they were soldiers. They decided to look for a house where they could stay the night, rest, and get fed. They end up arriving at a man's house. He was very curious at first of who the boys were and let them stay in the attic. Seth realized that the room that they were about to stay in had heavy iron sockets on either side and a third upon the door with a stout bar, used to lock the door. They were planning to secretly leave before the owner arrived because they believed that he was a Tory and was going to lock them up. However, after the man drops off their food he closes the door and leaves. After they finished eating they realized that the door was locked, they were staying in a Tory's house as prisoners. The only way to escape was to cut the wood with their knives. They pried open the wooden boards and attacked the Tory. They escaped but the Tory fought back as well.

References

1897 American novels
1890s children's books
American children's novels
Children's historical novels
Novels set during the American Revolutionary War
American spy novels
Junior spy novels